Yamafuku Maru was an auxiliary transport ship of the Imperial Japanese Navy during World War II. She served primarily as a troop transport and cargo ship during the war.

History
Yamafuku Maru was laid down in 1939 at the Sakurajima shipyard of Osaka Iron Works K.K. at the behest of shipping company, Yamashita Kisen K.K. She was launched in March 1940 and completed 10 July 1940. On 15 May 1941, she was requisitioned as an auxiliary transport by the Imperial Japanese Navy and attached to the Yokosuka Naval District under Captain Honda Torao Yokosuka with Yokosuka as her homeport.

On 23 November 1943, she departed Yokosuka for Truk as part of convoy No. 3123 with auxiliary transports Shoko Maru and Tatsutagawa Maru, IJN transport Manju Maru, cargo ship Shiganoura Maru, destroyer , and auxiliary gunboat Choan Maru No. 2 Go. On 5 January 1944, she was struck from the Navy List.

References

1940 ships
Ships sunk by American submarines
Maritime incidents in November 1943
World War II shipwrecks in the Pacific Ocean
Auxiliary ships of the Imperial Japanese Navy
Ships built by Osaka Iron Works